Mathias Pollestad (born 21 November 2004) is a speedway rider from Norway. He is a Norwegian national champion.

Speedway career 
In 2020, Pollestad won the Norwegian Individual Speedway Championship.

In 2022, he won the silver medal at the European Junior Championship.

References 

Living people
2004 births
Norwegian speedway riders